Gerald (Rusty) J. Hills, II is an American politician and educator in the state of Michigan and was formerly the senior advisor to former Michigan Attorney General Bill Schuette.

Rusty Hills also serves as Chancellor and Founder of Holy Spirits Institute, a non-profit educational venture. His goal is to establish a quality, four-year liberal arts Catholic college, located in the Greater Lansing area. The first class began in the fall of 2005.

Prior to beginning the college, Hills spent almost two decades in public service and politics. He was twice elected unanimously to serve as Chairman of the Michigan Republican Party. Before that, Hills served ten years as one of Governor John Engler's chief lieutenants following Engler's electoral ouster of two-term incumbent James Blanchard in November 1990.

Before his government service, Rusty Hills worked for then State Party Chairman Spencer Abraham, as Director of Communications, helping Abraham to re-engineer the renaissance of the Michigan Republican Party.

Prior to politics, Hills worked as a reporter and anchorman for CBS and NBC television affiliates in Lansing, Jackson and Flint, Michigan.

Hills has a Bachelor of Arts degree in Telecommunications from Michigan State University, and he earned a Master of Government degree from the University of Notre Dame.

Rusty is married to Carla Hills, and they have three children, Mary, Mike, and Katie.

External links 
 http://fordschool.umich.edu/faculty/gerald-hills
 http://www.umich.edu/news/index.html?Releases/2006/Nov06/r110706

Living people
Michigan Republican Party chairs
Michigan Republicans
Michigan State University alumni
University of Notre Dame alumni
Gerald R. Ford School of Public Policy faculty
Faculty
University of Michigan faculty
Year of birth missing (living people)